The 108th Aviation Regiment is a unit of the United States Army. It is part of the Kansas Army National Guard and has served with distinction in World War II (under a different designation and configuration), Iraq and Afghanistan. 

The 1st Battalion (Assault), 108th Aviation Regiment not only has its assault helicopter and MEDEVAC duties around the world, it assists throughout the United States with wildfires and hurricane relief.

The 1st Battalion, 108th Aviation Regiment wears the 35th Infantry Division patch as a subordinate unit of the Combat Aviation Brigade, 35th Infantry Division and it is assigned to the 635th Regional Support Group.

History

Structure
 1st Battalion (Assault) at Topeka (UH-60M) (KS ARNG):
Headquarters and Headquarters Company, Topeka, KS
Det 1, HHC (TX ARNG), Austin, TX
Company A (Assault), Topeka, KS
Company B (Assault), Salina, KS
Det 1, Co. B (Assault), Austin, TX
Company C (Assault) (TX ARNG), Austin, TX
Company D (Aviation Maintenance), Topeka, KS
Det 1, Co. D (AVIM), Austin, TX
Company E (Forward Support), Topeka, KS
Det 1, Co. E (FS), Austin, TX
 Company G (MEDEVAC), 1st Battalion (General Support), 111th Aviation Regiment, Topeka, KS
Det 5, Co. D (AVIM), 1st Battalion (General Support), 111th Aviation Regiment, Topeka, KS
Det 6, Co. E (FS), 1st Battalion (General Support), 111th Aviation Regiment, Topeka, KS

References

108